Slovenia has participated in the Eurovision Young Dancers 10 times since its debut in 1993.

Participation overview

See also
Slovenia in the Eurovision Song Contest
Slovenia in the Eurovision Young Musicians

External links 
 Eurovision Young Dancers

Countries in the Eurovision Young Dancers